The Chinese State Circus is a touring circus that presents Chinese circus arts to European audiences.  The show is based on Chinese acrobatic acts. All the performers come from China and are trained in the Chinese tradition of Ma Xi, or hippodrama (horse theater). But no live animals are used in the Chinese State Circus shows.

The show combines kung fu martial arts from the Shaolin Temple, artists from the Peking Opera, and other Chinese specialty acts. Continuity is provided by the figure of the Monkey King who appears between acts. The show also includes a lion dance, plate spinners, diabolos, aerial silks and an excerpt from the Chinese opera.

Acrobatics is a common art in China. It has a long history with a distinct national style, evolving from the Chinese people's everyday life and work.

Historical records, ancient carvings, and decorative patterns on utensils show the origin of Chinese acrobatics more than two thousand years ago in the period of the Warring States. During the Quin and Han Dynasties (221 BC – 220 AD) acrobatic artists developed a wide repertoire, and acrobatics was thus called "the show of a hundred tricks". It reached a high level as a performing art by the Han Dynasty.

Acrobatics has played an important role in cultural exchanges between China and other nations. In the past 35 years, Chinese acrobatic troupes have toured more than 100 countries and regions throughout the world. Their excellent performances were warmly welcomed and highly appreciated by the people of various countries.

The Chinese State Circus was started back in the 1990s after director Phillip Gandey witnessed a group of Chinese acrobats performing to great acclaim at the Monte Carlo Circus Festival. He was astounded at the quality, depth, and diversity of Chinese acrobatic troupes.

Tours
The circus has toured in the United Kingdom since 1992.

The circus is owned by Gandey World Class Productions.

The Chinese State Circus made history by being the first international entertainment Angola has hosted in over 40 years in December 2012 with their show Mulan.

In 2013 they toured their production Yin Yang extensively throughout the UK.

In 2015, the Chinese State Circus was included in the program for the first ever Biennale Internationale des Arts du Cirque which is held in the south of France.

The year 2016 saw the return of the Chinese State Circus with their newly devised production Dynasty.  The first leg of the tour premiered at the Nottingham Concert Hall followed by over 50 dates in various theaters across the UK. The theater tour was punctuated with some longer big top stands.

2017 - After the success of the previous year's tour, The Chinese State Circus toured the UK in a major big top Tour. The tour started in late March at Sandown Racecourse, Esher, and continued until late autumn.

See also
 Cirque Surreal

References

External links
 
 Facebook page
 Youtube page

Circuses
Overseas Chinese organisations